Sarideh (also Romanized as Sarīdeh; also known as Sardeh and Sereydeh) is a village in Jazin Rural District, in the Central District of Bajestan County, Razavi Khorasan Province, Iran. At the 2006 census, its population was 306, in 100 families.

References 

Populated places in Bajestan County